The Daily Pilot is a daily newspaper published by the Los Angeles Times to serve the communities of Sunset Beach, Huntington Beach, Fountain Valley, Newport Beach, Costa Mesa and Laguna Beach in Orange County, California.

The Daily Pilot is one of the publications of Times Community News, which is a subsidiary of the Los Angeles Times.

History 
Started in 1907 as a weekly newspaper named the Newport News, the paper was originally purchased by the Times''' parent company, Times Mirror, in 1961. Ingersoll Publications bought the paper in 1982. Adams Communications bought the Pilot in 1988, but sold it to a group backed by the New York businessman Elliot Stein the following year. The Glendale News Press was acquired a week later. Times Mirror bought the newspaper chain in 1993. On September 7, 2016, the Huntington Beach Independent and the Laguna Beach Coastline Pilot merged with the Daily Pilot''.

References

External links 
 

Mass media in Orange County, California
Daily newspapers published in Greater Los Angeles
Los Angeles Times
Costa Mesa, California
Newport Beach, California
1907 establishments in California
Publications established in 1907
Tribune Publishing